Ruegger is a surname. Notable people with the surname include:

Elsa Ruegger (1881–1924), Swiss cellist
Silvia Ruegger (1961–2019), Canadian long-distance runner
Tom Ruegger (born 1955/1956), American animator, screenwriter, storyboard artist, and lyricist